Weightlifting competitions at the 2007 Pan American Games in Rio de Janeiro, Brazilia are scheduled to be held between July 14 and 18, 2007 at the Complexo Esportivo Riocentro.

Competition schedule
There were at most three sessions of competition on each day of the 2007 Pan American Games Weightlifting program:
 Early afternoon session: 14:00–15:30 BRT
 Afternoon session: 16:00–17:30 BRT
 Evening session: 18:00–19:30 BRT

Medal table

Medalists

Men's events

Women's events

Participating nations
A total of 22 countries qualified athletes. The number of weightlifters a nation has entered is in parentheses beside the name of the country. A total of 118 lifters were entered.

See also
Weightlifting at the 2006 Central American and Caribbean Games
Weightlifting at the 2008 Summer Olympics

References
 Sports 123
 HickokSports
 pan.uol.com

P
2007
Events at the 2007 Pan American Games